Lake Isabella also called Isabella Lake, is a reservoir in Kern County, California, United States created by the earthen Isabella Dam. It was formed in 1953 when the U.S. Army Corps of Engineers dammed the Kern River at the junction of its two forks. At , it is one of the larger reservoirs in California. The area is in the southern end of the Sierra Nevada range and the lake itself is located in low mountains at an elevation of approximately  where summer temperatures reach over  but low enough to avoid winter snows on the surrounding ridges. Lake Isabella can be reached by car from Bakersfield via state Highway 178 and from Delano via Highway 155. The former towns of Isabella and Kernville were flooded by the newly created reservoir.

Isabella Dam deficiency
In 2006, Isabella Dam was found to be too unstable to hold a full amount of water and approximately 37% of a full reservoir had to be let out to restabilize the earth works. Presently, the U.S. Army Corps of Engineers won't let the water get above 63% of capacity until an estimated 10–15 years of studies and repairs are made. To further add to this problem, the Isabella Dam bisects an active fault that could lead to a catastrophic failure if an earthquake occurs along it. This fault was considered inactive when the site was studied in the late 1940s. The project to retrofit the dam was substantially completed in 2022.

On February 3rd 2023, the Army Corps of Engineers requested a deviation from the operating pool restriction of 361,000 acre-feet of water. If approved, Lake Isabella will be allowed to fill to it's full capacity of 568,000 acre-feet for the first time in nearly 15 years.

Recreation
The dam is operated by the U.S. Army Corps of Engineers and several recreation areas are located around the lake as a part of the Sequoia National Forest. The nearby towns of Lake Isabella and Kernville receive economic benefit from tourism created by the Lake Isabella Recreation Area and the whitewater rafting attraction of the Upper and Lower Kern River.

See also
List of dams and reservoirs in California
List of lakes in California
List of largest reservoirs of California
Erskine Fire

External links
Corps of Engineers Water Releases and Lake Level Information
Lake Isabella Recreation - Sequoia National Forest

References

External links

Reservoirs in Kern County, California
Lake Isabella
Lake Isabella
Lakes of the Sierra Nevada (United States)
Lake Isabella
Reservoirs in California
Reservoirs in Southern California